Kuch Dil Ne Kaha is a Pakistani television series, directed by Babar Javed, produced by Moomal Shunaid under banner Moomal Entertainment, and written by Bushra Ansari who also played the leading role in the series. Along with Ansari, it also stars Jawed Sheikh and Maria Wasti. It revolves around a middle-aged woman who is in an unloved marriage.

Plot 
Savera who is in an unfulfilled marriage, becomes friend of a stranger during her holidays. After the holidays, when she returns to her house it reveals on her that her husband has affair with her cousin, Savera. She calls her new friend who consoles her.

Cast 

 Bushra Ansari as Savera
 Jawed Sheikh as Ahsan
 Maria Wasti as Shaista
 Noman Masood as Kabeer
 Kanwaljit Singh
 Imran Abbas as Nadeem
 Shehroz Sabzwari as Naveed
 Sarwat Gillani
 Shehryar Zaidi
 Seemi Pasha
 Sohail Masood
 Naeem Sheikh

Awards and nominations

References

External links 
 

2006 Pakistani television series debuts